Decca Gold is a United States-based record label focusing on classical repertoire. It falls under the umbrella of Verve Label Group, owned by Universal Music Group. The label has a new roster of classical artists and partnerships, and was inspired by the historic Decca Gold Label Series established in 1956 that featured artists such as Andrés Segovia, Leonard Bernstein, Claudio Arrau and Dave Brubeck. The label's first album, Emerson String Quartet's Chaconnes and Fantasias: Music of Britten and Purcell, was released on April 21, 2017. Decca Gold partnered with the Van Cliburn International Piano Competition to release recordings of the Gold, Silver and Bronze winners. That album reached No. 1 on the Billboard Classical Traditional Chart.

Although the group's primary focus is on Western classical music, it also has subsidiaries dealing with jazz and musical theater. The main Decca label also issues some pop and country releases.

Universal Music Classical
Decca Classics
Deutsche Grammophon
Philips Records
Mercury Classics
Mercury KX

Decca Records
Decca Records
Decca Vision
EmArcy Records

See also
Similar sub-divisions of rival companies:
EMI Classics (now part of Warner Music Group)
Sony Masterworks
Warner Classics

References

External links 
 Official Decca Gold  website

American record labels
Classical music record labels
Labels distributed by Universal Music Group
Entertainment companies based in New York City
Companies based in New York City
Universal Music Group
Gold